The Encyclopedia of Library and Information Sciences (until third edition in the singular: Encyclopedia of Library and Information Science) is an encyclopedia for library and Information science related issues.

History
It was first published 1968-2003 in 73 volumes under the editorship of Allen Kent, Harold Lancour and Jay E. Daily. Second edition edited by Miriam Drake was published 2003 in 4 volumes, third edition edited by Marcia J. Bates and Mary Niles Maack came in 2010 in seven volumes and fourth edition edited by John D. McDonald and Michael Levine-Clark came in 2017 also in seven volumes.

Reviews
Joseph C. Meredith published a “Review of Reviews,”  summarizing thirty-nine earlier reviews of the first edition. His findings mentions “omissions, errors, inaccuracies, and inconsistencies; inadequate cross references; lack of uniformity of style; lack of balance in the length of articles; inadequate references and bibliographies.” He concludes that “although as an encyclopedia, the encyclopedia is a failure, it contains many excellent articles.”

James D. Anderson reviewed the 2nd edition. He found that "Regretfully, many of the problems of the first edition have been inherited, even exacerbated, by the second edition" and concluded: "This new second edition turns out to be not so new after all, especially with regard to the most basic articles. It cannot be recommended, especially for libraries that own the first edition. Overall, it appears to be a spin-off aimed primarily at making money rather than describing the state of the art in the twenty-first century. It reminds us of the drug companies that change the color of a pill in order to get a brand new patent."

The third edition was reviewed by Tony Chalcraft He notes: "Of the 565 articles, more than 400 are completely new to this edition, amounting to about 70 percent of total material." Whereas ELIS2 was devoted solely to library and information science, ELIS3 addresses in addition "archival science, museum studies and records management...as well as...bibliography, informatics, information systems and social studies of information." He concludes: "unquestioned achievement collecting material on the wide field of library and information sciences unobtainable elsewhere. There is simply no other work that comes near it in scale or spread and for librarians and information specialists it must be regarded as the pre-eminent reference source for the profession." The editor-in-chief wrote about the scope of the work.

Editions and volumes

 The Encyclopedia of Library and Information Science. First edition, Vol. 1-73.  1968-2003. Edited by Allen Kent, Harold Lancour and Jay E. Daily. New York: Marcel Dekker.
 Vol. 1: Accountability to Associcao Brasileira De Escolas De Biblioteconomia. 1968. 
 Vol. 2: Association Canadienne des Bibliotheques to Book World. 1969.
 Vol. 4: Calligraphy to church. 1970
 13, 1975 (via Google Books)
 23, 1978
 Vols. 46-47: indexes to v. 1-45.
 Vol. 73: index to v. 48-72.
 The Encyclopedia of Library and Information Science. Second edition, Vol. 1-4. 2003. Edited by Miriam A. Drake. New York: Marcel Dekker. . (+ 1 suppl. 2005  
 Encyclopedia of library and information sciences. Third edition, Vol. 1-7. 2010. Edited by Marcia J. Bates and Mary Niles Maack. Boca Raton, FL: CRC Press.  <ref>Contents, 3rd. edition, vol. 1-7: Academic Librarianship
 Encyclopedia of Library and Information Sciences Fourth edition, Vol. 1-7. 2017. Edited by John D. McDonald and Michael Levine-Clark. Boca Raton, FL: CRC Press.

References

External links
Introduction to the Encyclopedia of Library and Information Sciences, Third Edition, Marcia J. Bates and Mary Niles Maack
Encyclopedia of Library and Information Sciences,  Fourth Edition

American encyclopedias
Library science publications
Specialized encyclopedias